Ana María Montoya Prophater (born 24 September 1991) is an American-born Colombian footballer who plays as a midfielder. She has been a member of the Colombia women's national team.

College career
Montoya attended the University of Arizona.

International career
Montoya represented Colombia at the 2008 FIFA U-17 Women's World Cup and the 2010 FIFA U-20 Women's World Cup. At senior level, she played the 2012 Summer Olympics.

See also
 Colombia at the 2012 Summer Olympics

References

External links
 
Ana Maria Montoya Prophater - Profile and Statistics - SoccerPunter.com
OLYMPICS: Beaverton native Ana Maria Montoya leads Colombia into London 2012 | Portland Timbers
http://www.tucsonsentinel.com/sports/report/061412_soccer-notes/wildcat-play-colombian-soccer-team-olympics/
2012 Olympic Schedule Robust with UA-Linked Participants

1991 births
Living people
People with acquired Colombian citizenship
Colombian women's footballers
Women's association football midfielders
Colombia women's international footballers
Olympic footballers of Colombia
Footballers at the 2012 Summer Olympics
Colombian people of American descent
American women's soccer players
Soccer players from Portland, Oregon
American sportspeople of Colombian descent
Arizona Wildcats women's soccer players